Winona Township is an inactive township in Shannon County, Missouri, United States.

References

Townships in Missouri
Townships in Shannon County, Missouri